The short-tailed dtella (Gehyra baliola)  is a species of gecko in the genus Gehyra. It is endemic to the Torres Strait Islands  and to Cape York Peninsula in Australia.

References

Gehyra
Reptiles described in 1851
Taxa named by Auguste Duméril
Geckos of Australia